The 1903–04 season was the tenth in the history of Southern League. Division One, expanded up to 18 teams, was won by Southampton for the 6th time in history. Watford finished top of Division Two, earning automatic promotion, the first time that test matches had not been held. No clubs applied to join the Football League.

Division One

A total of 18 teams contest the division, including 15 sides from previous season and three new teams.

Teams promoted from Division Two:
 Brighton & Hove Albion
 Fulham

Newly elected team:
 Plymouth Argyle

Division Two

A total of eleven teams contest the division, including 4 sides from previous season, one team relegated from Division One and six new clubs in Division Two this season, all of which were reserve teams.

Teams promoted from Division Two:
 Watford

Newly elected teams:
 Millwall II
 Fulham II
 Portsmouth II
 Reading II
 Southampton II
 Swindon Town II

References

External links 
Southern League First Division Tables at RSSSF
Southern League Second Division Tables at RSSSF

1903-04
1903–04 in English association football leagues